Great American Living (formerly Ride TV and GAC Living) is an American cable television network. Owned by Great American Media, it primarily broadcasts programming devoted to the lifestyles of the American South.

Established in 2014, the network was originally focused on equestrianism.

History
The channel originally launched as Ride TV, a high-definition channel focused on the non-racing aspects of equestrian sports, horses, and the associated lifestyle. Ride TV was stated to be targeting both a rural, "Heartland" audience and a wider general audience, with an executive explaining that "horses are universal. Everyone recognizes the beauty and the power of this animal. We try to cater to anyone who gets that feeling when they see a horse running."

On June 8, 2021, it was announced that both Ride TV and Discovery Inc.'s Great American Country would be acquired by GAC Media, an investment group led by Tom Hicks and former Crown Media Holdings CEO Bill Abbott.

In August 2021, GAC Media announced that Great American Country and Ride TV would be relaunched as GAC Family and GAC Living on September 27, with the GAC initials re-backronymed to stand for "Great American Channels". GAC Living will focus on non-scripted lifestyle programming pertaining to the American South (with GAC Family shifting to a family-oriented general entertainment format akin to Hallmark Channel), effectively assuming GAC Family's previous format.

In July 2022, GAC Media announced that GAC Living would be renamed Great American Living on August 20, 2022, as part of their corporate rebranding as Great American Media.

Programming 
Its schedule was originally focused on horse sports such as equestrian, rodeo, and bull riding (such as the PBR Velocity Tour), purposefully excluding horse racing, whose niche was already filled by the TVG Networks. The channel has also produced original series, such as Cowgirls (a documentary-style series following women in rodeo) and This Old Horse (a documentary series chronicling notable horses, which was described as the network's equivalent to ESPN's 30 for 30 franchise).

Carriage
In October 2021, Frndly TV reached a carriage agreement for GAC Family and GAC Living.

In November 2021, GAC Media reached a deal with Philo to add GAC Living and GAC Family.

References

External links
 GAC Living website

Television channels and stations established in 2014
English-language television stations in the United States